Weibersbach is a river of Bavaria, Germany. It is left tributary of the Kahl in Schimborn, a district of Mömbris.

See also
List of rivers of Bavaria

Rivers of Bavaria
Rivers of Germany